Scales of Justice is a detective novel by Ngaio Marsh. it is the eighteenth novel to feature Roderick Alleyn, and was first published in 1955.  With a classic 'Golden Age' crime novel's setting, in the idyllic, self-contained, rural English community of Swevenings, the suspects all members of a tight-knit social group revolving around the local baronet and his family (the Lacklanders), the plot concerns the brutal murder of Colonel Carterette, an enthusiastic fisherman, who is preparing for publication the deceased squire's memoirs, which include the admission that as a high-ranking diplomat before World War Two, the baronet had treasonably put class before country in what has been called the Herrenvolk heresy, and knowingly let a young member of the embassy staff take the blame. The young man in question, who idolised the Lacklander ambassador, had committed suicide and his eccentric father is now the murdered colonel's neighbour.

Apart from its ingenious plotting, murder method and solution (revolving around the proposition that fishes' scales are individually identifiable in the same way as human fingerprints, hence the punning title), the novel represents a shift in the author's presentation of the English gentry, with whom she was on close terms from her youthful days in New Zealand, and then in 1920s London. (Comparison has been made with Marsh's somewhat more deferential pre-War presentation of the English landed gentry in earlier Alleyn novels; with the 1941 Surfeit of Lampreys showing a more ambivalent attitude.) Through its plot, characters and solution, the book is frankly critical of its rural gentry, their values and actions, especially in key confrontations between Lady Lacklander and the dead boy's father, and between the kindly, conservative District Nurse Kettle and the interloper revealed to be the murderer, for whom considerable reader sympathy is elicited.

Television adaptation and accusations of snobbism 
This novel was adapted in 1994 for the television series The Inspector Alleyn Mysteries, with Patrick Malahide as Roderick Alleyn and, prominently among an outstanding cast, Elizabeth Spriggs as Lady Lacklander and Frances Barber as Mrs Cartarette. It is interesting that, according to Marsh's first biographer Margaret Lewis, a proposed and abandoned 1955 BBC radio adaptation has the reader's filed note: "we should have to eliminate the appalling snobbishness". As Dr Lewis justly comments, "a truer reading of the novel would be that the appalling snobbishness is accurately depicted and firmly ridiculed by the author".

References

External links
 

Roderick Alleyn novels
1955 British novels
Collins Crime Club books
British detective novels